I'm Impressed may refer to:

"I'm Impressed", a song by Yourcodenameis:milo from their 2007 album They Came from the Sun 
"I'm Impressed", a song by They Might Be Giants from their 2007 album The Else